"Rock and Roll Love Letter" is the second single from American Tim Moore's second album, Behind the Eyes. Tim Moore's original version was not successful. It was later covered by the band Bay City Rollers, and that version became a Top 40 hit.

Bay City Rollers version

This version was released as a single in 1976 and was successful, reaching number 6 in Canada and number 28 in the United States.  The single was not released in the UK.

Chart performance

Weekly charts

Year-end charts

Other cover versions
 The Dirty Angels covered the song in 1975, released in the U.S. only.
 In 1977, Tina Arena and John Bowles recorded a version for their album Tiny Tina and Little John.
 Pink Lady recorded a Japanese-language version of the song in their 1977 debut album Pepper Keibu.
 The Records covered "Rock and Roll Love Letter" in 1979.  It was released in the UK as a non-album single.  It was later included as a CD bonus track on their Shades in Bed LP.
 In July 21st, 1988, Eri Nitta recorded a Japanese version of the song as her ninth single.

References

External links
 

1975 singles
1976 singles
Tim Moore (singer-songwriter) songs
Bay City Rollers songs
1975 songs
Arista Records singles
Asylum Records singles
Songs about rock music
Songs about letters (message)